The women's track cycling sprint competition at the 1988 Summer Olympics was held from 21 to 24 September. Estonian rider competing for the USSR Erika Salumäe won gold, while East Germany's Christa Luding-Rothenburger won silver and Connie Paraskevin-Young of the United States won bronze.

Competition format
The competition was held as a knock-out tournament, preceded by a qualifying round.

The qualifying round had all participants complete one timed individual sprint, with their times deciding seeding in the eighth-finals. No cyclists were eliminated.

In the knock-out stages, the winners of each sprint progressed to the next round. The eighth-finals were held as four sprints with three cyclists in each, with following repechages for the second and third placed. The quarter-finals, semi-finals and finals were contested head-to-head, best of three sprints. In addition, a one-off four-cyclist sprint was held to decide fifth to eighth places.

Schedule

Results

Qualification

Eighth-finals

 Q  Qualified for next round
 R  Qualified for repechage

Repechages

 Q  Qualified for next round

Quarter-finals

 Q  Qualified for next round

Semi-finals

 Q  Qualified for next round

Finals

References

External links
  (results, see page 213 in PDF)

Track cycling at the 1988 Summer Olympics
Cycling at the Summer Olympics – Women's sprint
Olymp
Cyc